is a Japanese footballer who play as a forward. He currently plays for Fukui United.

Club career
He played four seasons for FC Kariya, and two seasons with Fujieda MYFC. On 2016, Oishi joined Tochigi SC. Missing out on J2 promotion, Oishi decided to leave Tochigi to join J2-based team Renofa Yamaguchi in 2017.

For the 2020 season, he returned to Fujieda MYFC after five years since his departure. He helped the club to earn promotion for the J2, being it the first time Fujieda has done so. However, he decided to not renew his contract at the club, and left Fujieda at the end of the season.

On 18 January 2023, Oishi was announced as a new signing for HFL club Fukui United.

Career statistics

Club
.

References

External links
Profile at Renofa Yamaguchi
Profile at Tochigi SC

1989 births
Living people
Kanagawa University alumni
Association football people from Kanagawa Prefecture
Japanese footballers
J2 League players
J3 League players
Japan Football League players
FC Kariya players
Fujieda MYFC players
Tochigi SC players
Renofa Yamaguchi FC players
SC Sagamihara players
Fukui United FC players
Association football forwards